José Francisco Peña Gómez (6 March 1937 – 10 May 1998) was a politician from the Dominican Republic. He was the leader of the Dominican Revolutionary Party (PRD), a three-time candidate for president of the Dominican Republic and former Mayor of Santo Domingo. He is considered, along with Joaquín Balaguer and Juan Bosch, as one of the most prominent Dominican political figures of the 20th century.

Early life 
Born to María Marcelin, a Haitian woman, and Oguís Vincent, a Haitian immigrant, on March 6, 1937 in Mao, Dominican Republic, Peña Gómez was adopted as an infant by Simón Pichardo and Andrea Rodríguez de Pichardo, a Dominican family, when his parents had to flee to Haiti (where they died) in order to save their lives as the Dominican dictator Rafael Trujillo enacted the Parsley Massacre against Haitians that same year. In later years, Peña Gómez’ opponents would use his Haitian ancestry against him.

Peña Gómez received a BA-equivalent degree from the Autonomous University of Santo Domingo (UASD) in 1966 before going on to higher studies at the Sorbonne in Paris.

The April Civil War and Exile 
Since 1961, Peña Gómez became a supporter of Juan Bosch, then leader of the Dominican Revolutionary Party (PRD). Bosch won the presidential elections of 1962, the first democratic president in 32 years, but his government was ousted in a military coup on September 25, 1963. In 1965, Peña rose to political prominence as he went on Radio Santo Domingo and called for a popular insurrection against the military coup and a return of Bosch. U. S. President Lyndon Johnson ordered a military invasion to prevent what he feared was a possible communist movement within the country.

Leadership of the P.R.D. 
In December 1973, Bosch formed the Dominican Liberation Party (P.L.D.). Under Peña's leadership, the P.R.D. won the presidential election in 1978 (Antonio Guzmán) and 1982 (Salvador Jorge Blanco), and he himself was Mayor of Santo Domingo from 1982 to 1986. His period is mostly remembered for the creation of the Plaza Güibia (Güibia Plaza), on the seaside boulevard and plantation of ornamental trees in mayor Santo Domingo city avenues.

In 1990, Peña ran for the presidency, coming in third behind Balaguer of the Social Christian Reformist Party (PRSC) and Bosch of the PLD.

By 1994, the PRD was solidified and motivated, and Peña was once again the party's standard-bearer in the presidential election. Even by Dominican standards, the 1994 campaign was violent and dirty. Peña lost to Balaguer in an extremely tight election marred by numerous irregularities. A number of Peña supporters showed up to vote only to discover their names had vanished from the rolls. Peña called a general strike which was widely supported by his followers. After international protest, an investigation was mounted that raised grave concerns about the poll's legitimacy. The electoral board did not know the total number of registered voters, and the voting lists distributed at polling stations did not match those given to the parties. The investigation also revealed that about 200,000 people had been removed from the polls. After intense negotiations, Balaguer announced that he would leave office prematurely in 1996 after serving seven terms in power.

In the 1996 poll, Peña won the first round of voting but fell short of the majority needed. In the second round of voting, Leonel Fernández, a lawyer representing the PLD, won a narrow victory due to an alliance between the PLD with Balaguer's PRSC.

Personal life 
Peña Gómez married four times, the first time with Julia Idalia Guaba Martínez. The children are as follows: Lourdes Fátima, Luz del Alba “Luchy”, José Francisco “José Frank”, and Francisco Antonio “Tony” Peña Guaba.

His second marriage was to Ana Rosa Meléndez (former Director of the Museum of Modern Dominican Art); their child was María Rosa Peña Meléndez.

His fourth and last marriage was to Peggy Cabral, daughter of the Dominican writer Manuel del Cabral. Peña had nine children in total.

Final years
Peña Gómez died on May 10, 1998 in Cambita Garabitos, San Cristóbal, 6 days before the mayoral elections of Santo Domingo, in which he was running.

Peña Gómez was one of the most popular leaders in recent political history in Dominican Republic, especially among the poor masses.

Being a key political figure until his death, the main Dominican Republic international airport was renamed from "Aeropuerto Internacional Las Américas" to "Aeropuerto Internacional Las Américas José Francisco Peña Gómez".

Legacy
A metro station and an International Airport in Santo Domingo is named in honor of Peña Gómez.

See also
List of political parties in the Dominican Republic
Politics of the Dominican Republic

References

External links
Dominican Today: The legacy of Dr. José Francisco Peña Gómez 

1937 births
1998 deaths
University of Paris alumni
Harvard University alumni
Michigan State University alumni
Universidad Autónoma de Santo Domingo alumni
Dominican Revolutionary Party politicians
Dominican Republic people of Haitian descent
Mayors of places in the Dominican Republic
Candidates for President of the Dominican Republic